This is a list of Assembly Members (AMs; Welsh: Aelodau'r Cynulliad, ACau) elected to the third National Assembly for Wales at the 2007 election. There are a total of 60 members elected, 40 were elected from first past the post constituencies with a further 20 members being returned from five regions, each electing four AMs through mixed member proportional representation.

Composition of the Assembly 

Government parties denoted with bullets (•)

AMs by party 
This is a list of AMs elected in 2011, the changes table below records all changes in party affiliation during the session. See here a list of AMs elected in the 2007 election.

Members by constituency and region

Constituency members

Regional members

Changes 
 8 December 2009: Mohammad Asghar defected from Plaid Cymru to the Conservative Party.

See also 
Government of the 3rd National Assembly for Wales
2007 National Assembly for Wales election

References 

Lists of members of the Senedd